Lithuanian–Polish–Ukrainian Brigade (LITPOLUKRBRIG; ;) is a multinational brigade countries of the Lublin Triangle consisting of units from the Lithuanian, Polish and Ukrainian armies. Other countries are free to join the trilateral agreement. An agreement on its creation was signed on November 16, 2009. The brigade was to reach operational status in autumn 2011, but it was delayed; a January 2012 estimate put that date at some time in 2013. The unit was finally formed on September 19, 2014. In July 2015 the defense ministers of the three countries signed an agreement on the operation of the unit.

The LITPOLUKRBRIG headquarters (HQ) was opened in Lublin (Poland) on 25 January 2016.

Lithuania and Poland are NATO members, while Ukraine is Enhanced Opportunity Partner of NATO.
The brigade participated in the training exercise "Brave Band" in February 2016.

Name
2017-10 named after Konstanty Ostrogski.

History

On June 14, 2007, during an EU Defence Ministers' meeting, Lithuanian, Polish and Ukrainian ministers agreed to create a multinational unit. In fall of 2008 the proposed unit type was specified as a brigade. The three countries did have experience in past joint military operations, most notably, through the Lithuanian-Polish Peace Force Battalion and the Polish–Ukrainian Peace Force Battalion. Lithuania and Poland are NATO members, Ukraine is currently not but requested to join the NATO Membership Action Plan in January 2008. In November 2009 a "Protocol of Intent" covering formation of a joint Lithuanian, Polish and Ukrainian brigade ("LITPOLUKRBRIG")  was signed by Defense Minister of Lithuania, Rasa Jukneviciene, Deputy Secretary of the Polish Ministry of Defense Stanisław Komorowski (representing the indisposed Defense Minister of Poland, Bogdan Klich) and acting Defense Minister of Ukraine Valeriy Ivashchenko.

On March 17, 2014, The Daily Telegraph (online edition) reported, as part of its live coverage of the 2014 Crimean crisis, that Poland's defence ministry had announced it was re-launching plans to establish a joint Polish, Ukrainian and Lithuanian military brigade.

The ministry said "defence ministers would meet later that week to discuss the formation of the brigade that would straddle Nato’s eastern border and bring Ukraine’s armed forces closer to the Western fold".

In February 2016, the brigade participated in the training exercise "Brave Band".

Organization

The brigade has its headquarters and staff in Lublin, Poland, with the national components stationed in their respective countries and actually gathering together only for exercises and foreign missions. Only its staff officers are supposed to cooperate on a regular basis. The unit is intended to be used to fulfill tasks given to it by NATO, European Union (EU) and the United Nations. The operating language of the brigade is agreed to be English.  The unit was formed on 19 September 2014. Headquarters was officially opened in Lublin on 25 January 2016, in a ceremony attended by defence ministers of the three countries.

Political ramifications

The agreement between Lithuania, Poland and Ukraine was signed two days before an EU summit with Russia aimed at increasing cooperation between the two. Analysts expected the formation of the brigade could anger Russia, because Russia is against Ukraine joining NATO. A NATO spokesman welcomed the Polish-Lithuanian plan, stating that cooperation may increase trust and capabilities.

According to Poland's Deputy Defence Minister Stanisław Komorowski "This move reflects our support for Ukraine. We want to tie Ukraine closer to Western structures, including military ones".

In November 2009 Polish newspaper Gazeta Wyborcza predicted the chances that the brigade would become a reality were larger if Yulia Tymoshenko would win the 2010 Ukrainian presidential election, and smaller if Viktor Yanukovych would win them. Yanukovych won the elections, but preparations for the brigade continued. Yanukovych stated on May 27, 2010 that Ukraine considered Ukraine's relations with NATO as a partnership, "And Ukraine can't live without this [partnership], because Ukraine is a large country".

Despite initial concerns that the LITPOLUKRBRIG provoked Russia, since 2016 the "Trilateral Brigade" (this term is used by the US military to identify the unit) has continued operating out of Lublin and pursued its "four main missions of international cooperation: executing and participating in battle staff training, battalion staff officer courses, multinational exercises, and activities of the Joint Military Training Group–Ukraine." Even with the 2022 Russo-Ukrainian War, the Trilateral Brigade HQ is staffed by a blend of army personnel: 5 Lithuanians, 58 Poles, and 18 Ukrainians. This HQ can plan, organize, command, and control approximately 4,500 LITPOLUKR troops for international military operations. Finally, the success of the Trilateral Brigade has led two researchers - Lt Col Jahara Matisek (US Naval War College) and Prof. Will Reno (Northwestern University) - to contend in 2022 that this unit provides a comparative advantage and flexible options against Russia, and is a model for future security cooperation between NATO and non-NATO militaries.

See also
Multinational Engineer Battalion Tisa
Military of the European Union
Multinational Corps Northeast - NATO formation grouping units from Denmark, Germany and Poland
Polish–Lithuanian Commonwealth (historical)

References

External links
 List intencyjny w sprawie LITPOLUKRBRIG podpisany Polish Ministry of Defense official announcement (November 16, 2009)

Lublin Triangle
Brigades of Lithuania
Army brigades of Poland
Brigades of Ukraine
Military units and formations established in 2009
Multinational army units and formations
Lithuania–Ukraine military relations
Lithuania–Poland military relations
Poland–Ukraine military relations
Intermarium